John "Skip" Barber III (born November 16, 1936) is an American retired racecar driver who is most famous for previously owning and founding the Skip Barber Racing Schools.

Driving career
Barber started racing in 1958 while studying at Harvard University, where he earned a degree in English.

In the mid-1960s, he won three SCCA national championships in a row and finished third in the 1967 United States Road Racing Championship. Later, Barber won consecutive Formula Ford National Championships (1969 and 1970), a record tied only recently.

At the start of the 1971 season he purchased a March 711, which he planned to take back to the United States and race in the U.S. Formula 5000 series. Before he did so, he took part in the Monaco Grand Prix, Dutch Grand Prix, United States Grand Prix, and Canadian Grand Prix in a privately funded March. He returned to the U.S. and Canadian races in 1972. After that, he raced GT cars.

Retirement leads to Skip Barber Racing
When his racing career ended, Barber's belief that auto racing was "coachable" in the same manner as any other sport—at the time, a distinctly minority position—led him to create the eponymously named racing school, and a year later the equal-car race series.

In 1975, with two borrowed Lola Formula Fords and four students, Barber started the Skip Barber School of High Performance Driving. In 1976 it was renamed the "Skip Barber Racing School", and that same year he created the Skip Barber Race Series. Barber divested from the racing school in 1999.

Barber was the owner and operator of Lime Rock Park, a road-racing venue in Connecticut. In April of 2021 he sold the facility to Lime Rock Group, LLC. 
He maintains a minority stake. He lives in the nearby town of Sharon, CT with wife Judy.

Barber was inducted into the SCCA Hall of Fame on March 2, 2013.

Racing record

SCCA National Championship Runoffs

Complete Formula One results
(key)

References

Lime Rock Park: 35 Years of Racing, by Rich Taylor, Sharon Mountain Press, 1992, page 153, 

1936 births
American Formula One drivers
SCCA Formula Super Vee drivers
Harvard College alumni
Living people
Racing drivers from Philadelphia
SCCA National Championship Runoffs winners
Germantown Friends School alumni